The Vermilion Tigers are a junior "B" ice hockey team based in Vermilion, Alberta, Canada. They are members of the North Eastern Alberta Junior B Hockey League (NEAJBHL). They play their home games at Vermilion Stadium.

History
The Tigers are two-time Canadian Western Junior B Keystone Cup Champions.  The first team from Alberta ever win the Keystone Cup, winning in 1984 and 1985.

Season-by-season record

Note: GP = Games played, W = Wins, L = Losses, OTL = Overtime Losses, Pts = Points, GF = Goals for, GA = Goals against, PIM = Penalties in minutes

NHL alumni

Awards and trophies
NEAJBHL League Champions 2008

Coach of The Year
Mike Applegate:  2006–07 & 2009–10
Taylor Holt & Mark Hines: 2012–13

General Manager of the Year
Darcy Fadden: 2010–11

External links
Official website of the Vermilion Tigers

Ice hockey teams in Alberta